Miniature figures may be used as:
Miniature figure (gaming), in miniature wargaming and roleplaying games
A collectable figurine, often an artistic, and sometimes a prehistoric or antique specimen 
Toy soldier
Lego minifigure